Khosbijan (also Romanized as Khosbījān; also known as Ḩosbījān-e Soflá and Khushbījān) is a village in Pol-e Doab Rural District, Zalian District, Shazand County, Markazi Province, Iran. At the 2006 census, its population was 543, in 147 families.

References 

Populated places in Shazand County